Black Tears is a 1998 Spanish romantic drama film directed by Ricardo Franco and Fernando Bauluz.  Ricardo Franco's swan song, filming was unfinished upon Franco's death and then completed under assistant director Fernando Bauluz. It stars Ariadna Gil and Fele Martínez alongside Elena Anaya, Ana Risueño and Elvira Mínguez.

Plot 
The plot tracks Andrés, a photographer engaged to his long-time girlfriend Alicia who falls romantically for a mentally-ill woman, Isabel (under the guise of 'Ana'), some time after their first encounter when the assault on Andrés by Isabel together with another woman, Cinta—as well as Andrés' ensuing kidnapping, humiliation and rape—took place.

Cast

Production 
The screenplay was penned by Ricardo Franco and Ángeles González Sinde, based on an original story by Ricardo Franco and Dionisio Pérez Galindo. The plot has a backdrop of autobiographical elements reportedly inspired by Ricardo Franco's relationship with Jean Seberg while the latter was married to Romain Gary. Produced by Sogetel and Aurum, the film featured a 300 million ₧ budget. Director Ricardo Franco died in the midst of the shooting and  filming was thus completed by assistant director Fernando Bauluz.

Release 
The film screened at the 43rd Valladolid International Film Festival (Seminci) in October 1998. It also screened at the 49th Berlin International Film Festival (Berlinale) in February 1999. It was theatrically released in Spain on 26 February 1999.

Accolades 

|-
| align = "center" | 1998 || 43rd Valladolid International Film Festival || Silver Spike for Best Actress || Ariadna Gil ||  || align = "center" | 
|-
| align = "center" | 2000 || 14th Goya Awards || Best Actress || Ariadna Gil ||  || align = "center" | 
|}

See also 
 List of Spanish films of 1999

References 

Spanish romantic drama films
1998 romantic drama films
1990s Spanish-language films
Films shot in Portugal
1990s Spanish films